The Journal of Sexual Medicine (JSM) is a peer-reviewed medical journal published on behalf of the International Society for Sexual Medicine. Besides the latter society, it is also an official journal for the International Society for the Study of Women's Sexual Health. The editor-in-chief is John P. Mulhall. The related open access journal, Sexual Medicine, was launched in 2013.

The journal was published by Wiley between 2004 and 2015. It has been published by Elsevier since 2016.

Contents 
The Journal of Sexual Medicine covers basic science and clinical research studies in the psychological and biological aspects of male and female sexual function and dysfunction. It publishes articles in the following categories:
 Original research articles
 Case reports
 Review articles
 Commentaries
 Editorials
 Letters to the Editor

Abstracting and indexing 
The journal is abstracted and indexed in Academic Search, Chemical Abstracts Service, Current Contents/Clinical Medicine, EMBASE, Index Medicus/MEDLINE, PubMed, PsycINFO, and the Science Citation Index Expanded. According to the Journal Citation Reports, the journal has a 2020 impact factor of 3.802, ranking it 22nd out of 85 journals in the category "Urology & Nephrology".

References

External links 

 
 International Society for Sexual Medicine
 International Society for the Study of Women’s Sexual Health
 Sexual Medicine:  

English-language journals
Monthly journals
Publications established in 2004
Sexology journals
Elsevier academic journals
Academic journals associated with learned and professional societies
Wiley (publisher) academic journals